is the title of Toei Company's 34th entry in its long-running Super Sentai franchise. It follows an angelic motif as well as a trading card theme. It joined Kamen Rider W, and later Kamen Rider OOO, as a program featured in TV Asahi's Super Hero Time programming block. The series ties in with the arcade game Super Sentai Battle: Dice-O, with the characters using cards resembling Carddass cards used in the game to transform and access various weapons, similar to the concept of Kamen Rider Decade and its link to Kamen Rider Battle: Ganbaride. Goseigers footage was later used for the 2013 Power Rangers series Power Rangers Megaforce and its second season Super Megaforce.

The cast and characters were revealed at an event at Tokyo Dome City on January 30 and 31, 2010. The protagonists also had a cameo appearance in the film, Samurai Sentai Shinkenger vs. Go-onger: GinmakuBang!!.

Tensou Sentai Goseiger premiered in South Korea in July 2011 as Power Rangers Miracle Force. A June 2012 press release has revealed that the 2013 series, Power Rangers Megaforce, would adapt Goseiger (to the extent of re-using the names Tensou, Gosei, and Warstar).

The phrase  is utilized in the promotional materials for the series.

Story

Unknown to the people of Earth, there is a branch of humanity called the  whose mission is to protect the Earth. However, five apprentice Gosei Angels are on Earth at the time and, while finding a way to return home, they become the Goseigers to stop Warstar. After many hard battles the Warstar are defeated, but soon after, the monstrous Yuumajuu emerge from their slumber and the Goseigers receive aid from a special being called Gosei Knight who once fought against the Yuumajuu in the past. They defeat the Yuumajuu as well, but the evil robotic Matrintis Empire rises to take over the Earth with the data acquired from the last two factions. Once they are defeated, the Goseigers face their greatest enemy in the one who has been manipulating the other groups from the very beginning: a rogue Gosei Angel who took their mission to protect the Earth to a dangerous extreme by planning to destroy all life and recreate the world in his image.

Episodes

Production
The trademark for the series was filed by Toei Company on August 12, 2009.

Films
In addition to the protagonists' debut in Samurai Sentai Shinkenger vs. Go-onger: GinmakuBang!!, Goseiger has had three theatrical releases where they are the primary characters.

Epic on the Movie

 was released on August 7, 2010, double-billed with the Kamen Rider W film Forever: A to Z/The Gaia Memories of Fate. The story of the film concerns the return of Warstar and two meteorites heading for Earth, among many other natural disasters taking place. The events of the movie take place between Epics 23 and 24.

Goseiger vs. Shinkenger

The film  was released in theaters on January 22, 2011, featuring a crossover between the Goseiger and Shinkenger casts and characters. The heroes of Kaizoku Sentai Gokaiger also make a cameo appearance in the film. The events of the movie take place between Epics 32 and 33.

Gokaiger Goseiger Super Sentai 199 Hero Great Battle

 is the film commemorating the 35th anniversary of the Super Sentai Series. The film primarily featured the casts of Goseiger and  Kaizoku Sentai Gokaiger, among the 199 total heroes from the Super Sentai series to appear. The film was originally scheduled for release on May 21, 2011. However, due to the 2011 Tōhoku earthquake and tsunami, filming was affected and the film's release was postponed to June 11.

Super Hero Taisen

 is a film which features a crossover between the characters of the Super Sentai and Kamen Rider series. The protagonists of Gokaiger and Kamen Rider Decade are featured, as well as those of Kamen Rider Fourze, Kamen Rider OOO, and Tokumei Sentai Go-Busters. Yudai Chiba reprises his role as Gosei Red in the film.

Special DVD
 is a special DVD.

 is a special DVD.

V-Cinema

 is a V-Cinema release for Goseiger, serving as an epilogue for the series. The direct-to-video film also features  in a guest starring role. Come Back! Tensou Sentai Goseiger became available for rental on June 10, 2011, and for sale on June 21, 2011. The events of the movie take place between Epic 50 and the events of Kaizoku Sentai Gokaiger.

Cast
: 
: 
: 
: 
: 
: 
: 
Narration, : 
: 
/: 
///: 
: 
: 
: 
: 
: 
:

Guest stars

: 
: 
Himself (10): 
: 
: 
: 
Moune's Mother (25): 
:

Songs
Opening theme
 
 Lyrics: Yumi Yoshimoto
 Composition: YOFFY
 Arrangement: Hiroaki Kagoshima
 Artist: NoB (Project.R)
Ending theme
 
 Lyrics: Shoko Fujibayashi
 Composition: Takafumi Iwasaki
 Arrangement: Project.R (Kenichiro Ōishi)
 Artist: Hideyuki Takahashi (Project.R)
 Episodes: 1 – 7, 12, 15, 16, 22, 28, 31, 33, 39 – 41, 43 & 48 – 50
 
 Lyrics: Shoko Fujibayashi
 Composition: Takafumi Iwasaki
 Arrangement: Project.R (Kenichiro Ōishi)
 Artist: Hideyuki Takahashi
 Episodes: 8 – 11, 13, 14, 17 – 21, 23 – 27, 29, 30, 32 & 34 – 38
 
 Lyrics: Shoko Fujibayashi
 Composition: Takafumi Iwasaki
 Arrangement: Project.R (Kenichiro Ōishi)
 Artist: Goseigers & Hideyuki Takahashi
 Episodes: 42 & 44 – 47
A single containing the opening theme, first ending theme, their karaoke variations, as well as two image songs, was released on March 17, 2010. A music video for the opening theme featuring NoB and Gosei Red was recorded and put on YouTube by Columbia Music Entertainment. In its first week of release, the single reached #6 on the Oricon Weekly Charts.

Notes

References

External links

Official page at Toei Company
Official page at Super-Sentai.net
Official page at Nippon Columbia

Official page at Bandai

2010 Japanese television series debuts
2011 Japanese television series endings
Super Sentai
Angels in television
Japanese supernatural television series
Japanese fantasy television series